Vachellia jacquemontii is a species of plant native to the Thar Desert of India and Pakistan. The species name refers to French botanist Victor Jacquemont.

This plant has a number of traditional medicinal uses, including treatment of snakebite, induction of abortion, and for chronic renal disease.

This shrub also plays an important role in stabilizing the sand dunes of its native desert habitat. The wood is valuable as firewood because it produces a large amount of heat. The branches are used in construction of huts and fences and the sturdy roots are used as rope.

See also
 Arid Forest Research Institute

Notes

References
 L R Burdak (1982): Recent advances in desert afforestation, Dehradun
 R C Ghosh (1977): Hand book on afforestation techniques, Dehradun.
 R K Gupta & Ishwar Prakasah (1975): Environmental analysis of the Thar Desert, Dehradun.
 R N Kaul (1963): Need for afforestation in the arid zones of India, LA-YAARAN, Vol 13

jacquemontii
Flora of India (region)
Flora of Pakistan